Selling New York was an American television series airing on HGTV. It featured real estate brokers from three Manhattan real estate companies (Gumley Haft Kleier, CORE, and Warburg) selling real estate to New York's elite. Season 1 was filmed between September 2009 and February 2010.  It premiered in March 2010 and concluded in June of the same year.

The series was renewed for a second season for 39 new episodes. It premiered on January 6, 2011. The show ended after its fourth season in 2014.

It is produced by Canadian production company, JV Productions Inc.

The series has inspired Los Angeles and European spin-offs titled Selling LA which premiered October 13, 2011 on HGTV and Selling London.

References

External links
Series Website

HGTV original programming
English-language television shows
2010 American television series debuts